Australia will compete at the 2019 World Championships in Athletics in Doha, Qatar, from 27 September to 6 October 2019. Australia will be represented by 59 athletes.

Medalists

Results

Men
Track and road events

Field events

Combined events – Decathlon

Women 

Track and road events

Field events

References

Nations at the 2019 World Athletics Championships
World Championships in Athletics
Australia at the World Championships in Athletics